Vaulx is a village of Wallonia and a district of the municipality of Tournai, located in the province of Hainaut, Belgium.

External links 
Site

Tournai
Former municipalities of Hainaut (province)